Nate Hill (born September 6, 1977) is an American performance artist based in East Harlem, NYC.

Biography 
Hill makes socially engaged work using public space – both online and offline – supporting himself with a separate career. Opting mainly to present work outside of the traditional art-world context, he engages with what he describes as the “non-gallery-going” population. Some of Hill's most well-known works have been Death Bear, White Power Milk, and Trophy Scarves. Hill has been featured in numerous publications including Vice, Huffington Post, Hyperallergic, Wall Street Journal, BlackBook, and The New York Times. 

Hill's art is often confrontational, described as "[poking] holes into people’s ideas of comfort and [forcing] them to negotiate how far they are willing to go." He adapts personas in social spaces such as Twitter or Tumblr that address issues of race, class, and power.

Hill was a Blade of Grass Artist Fellows in 2013.

References

External links
Sociopath.Online, current official Nate Hill website

American performance artists
Living people
1977 births